is a Japanese three-piece punk rock band from Urasoe, Okinawa, Japan, formed in 1998. The band released their first album when the members were 19. In 2001, despite low media attention, they produced a commercially-prominent second album Message, which eventually sold over two million record copies. Since then, they have released several albums with assorted success.

Band members 
  — bass guitar, vocals
  — guitar
  — drums

Discography

Albums

Singles

Compilations

References

Japanese pop punk groups
Musical groups from Okinawa Prefecture